Twin Forks is the eponymously titled debut studio album from Folk rock band Twin Forks. Produced by Ammar Malik and Robopop, the album was released on February 25, 2014, through Dine Alone Records.

Release and promotion
On February 20, 2014, USA Today premiered the album and listeners were allowed to stream it in its entirety.

Critical reception

Twin Forks received generally positive reviews from music critics. At Metacritic, they assign a "weighted average" score to selected independent ratings and reviews, and based upon five reviews the album has a score of a 71 out of 100, which means the album received "Generally favorable" reviews. At Rock Sound, Andrew Kelham rated the album an eight-out-of-a-ten, stating that this "is an album of freedom and exploration, the sound of people taking risks for the sake of song." Craig Manning of AbsolutePunk rated the album an 85-percent, saying that this release "is comfortable and likable". At Alternative Press, Aubrey Welbers rated the album four stars out of five, writing that "Although the musical and lyrical content are more mature, what hasn't changed is the familiar empathetic thrill of Carabba's [sic] songwriting." Rob Houston of HM rated the album a perfect five stars, stating how "Twin Forks feels like a great getaway to classic folk and the Americana genre", and says it is "Carrabba through and through." At This Is Fake DIY, Tom Doyle rated the album three stars out of five, indicating how the album "might be cookie-cutter, but cookies are delicious." Timothy Monger of Allmusic rated the album two-and-a-half stars out of five, cautioning "too much of this album panders to worn-out themes and clichés."

Track listing

Chart performance

References

2014 debut albums
Dine Alone Records albums
Twin Forks (band) albums